"Mayhem of the Music Meister!" is an episode of the Batman: The Brave and the Bold animated series. The episode features the villainous Music Meister (voiced by Neil Patrick Harris), who uses his power to control people through song to try to take over the world. Written by Michael Jelenic and directed by Ben Jones, the episode premiered on October 23, 2009, the 24th of the first season.

The musical episode, which has been compared to Buffy the Vampire Slayers "Once More, with Feeling", was generally well received by critics and viewers.  Unlike other episodes of The Brave and the Bold, this episode does not feature a cold open or teaser at the start.

Plot
The Music Meister, a villain capable of controlling others through song, induces Black Canary, Green Arrow, Aquaman, Black Manta, Gorilla Grodd and Clock King to hijack a United Nations communications satellite, launching it into space after they install a device for him ("I'm The Music Meister"). When Batman intervenes, he orders them to attack the hero, which they do in a dance style reminiscent of West Side Story. His plan successful, the Meister frustrates Batman once more, escaping by forcing his captives to dance towards the rocket blast, leaving Batman to rescue them rather than apprehend the villain. Meister escapes to an empty opera house where, in a reference to "The Phantom of the Opera", he plays the organ to a cardboard audience. Batman tries to capture him on a cross-town chase, as Meister releases the inmates and villains of Iron Heights Prison and Arkham Asylum ("Drives Us Bats"). Having heard Black Canary sing about her unrequited love for Batman ("If Only"), the Meister has fallen for her, but not enough to give up villainy, and she rejects him. Meister manages to capture Black Canary and Batman and puts them in a death trap ("Death Trap"), in an industrial-style set reminiscent of the staging for the show 'Tap Dogs'. They escape as Music Meister uses the satellite to hypnotize the world with his music. ("The World Is Mine") When Black Canary becomes his slave, Batman tricks Canary into singing as high as he, using the satellite to transmit her sonic scream and break Music Meister's mind control. Batman finally defeats the Music Meister, and kindly rejects Black Canary's advances for a final time. Though Black Canary gives up on Batman, she finds love with Green Arrow, who had also held unrequited feelings for her for the duration of the episode. ("If Only (Reprise)")

Reception
"Mayhem of the Music Meister!" screened June 24, 2009 at Comic-Con, where supervising producer James Tucker noted that he believed that the show would be successful after seeing people wearing Music Meister costumes after the episode's debut. The episode received a standing ovation at its debut, in part because of the humor of the Maestro's dance-inducing powers on the heroes and villains.

The episode was nominated for an Emmy Award and has been called one of television's best musicals. The episode has been used as an example of the merits of Batman: The Brave and the Bold.

Soundtrack

The soundtrack of "Mayhem of the Music Meister!" was released on October 23, 2009 as Batman: The Brave And The Bold: Mayhem of the Music Meister! (Soundtrack from the Animated Television Show). It contains 8 tracks from the episode and has been praised as being fun while criticized for its brevity.

Track listing

References

External links

2009 American television episodes
Animated television episodes
Musical television episodes
Batman: The Brave and the Bold episodes
DC Comics animated television episodes
Batman television series episodes